Stanisław Szczepaniak (17 August 1934 – 21 June 2015) was a Polish biathlete. He competed at the 1964 Winter Olympics and the 1968 Winter Olympics.

References

1934 births
2015 deaths
Polish male biathletes
Olympic biathletes of Poland
Biathletes at the 1964 Winter Olympics
Biathletes at the 1968 Winter Olympics
People from Tatra County